Stephen Paul Schnetzer (born June 11, 1948) is an American actor.

Life and career
Schnetzer, who is of German descent, was born in Canton, Massachusetts, the son of Thomas A. Schnetzer. His mother was a war bride from Algeria. He attended Catholic Memorial School. After playing the role of Julie Olson Williams' brother, Steven Olson, on Days of Our Lives, he joined the cast of the ABC soap opera One Life to Live as fitness expert Marcello Salta. He later played attorney Cass Winthrop on Another World (1982–86, 1987–99). After the cancellation of Another World, he made guest appearances as Cass Winthrop on the CBS soap opera As the World Turns (1999–2002; 2005; 2006) and on Guiding Light (2002). He has also been billed to under the names Stephen Schnetzer, Stephen St. Paul, and Steven St. Paul.

Schnetzer has recently become a prolific voiceover talent advertising for many companies, such as Mercedes-Benz, and various prescription and over-the-counter medications. His voice is frequently heard today on radio and television.

He has appeared in numerous recent regional theater productions, including The Quality of Life (2009), Legacy of Light (world premiere)(2009) and Noises Off (2006–2007) at Arena Stage. On Broadway, he appeared in, among other productions, The Goat, or Who Is Sylvia? and Filumena (the latter directed by Laurence Olivier).

Personal life

Schnetzer married Amy Ingersoll in 1976. In 1982, he married his second wife, actress Nancy Snyder, whom he met while she was playing Katrina Karr on One Life to Live. They have two children, Max and Ben Schnetzer, who is also an actor.

Filmography

References

External links
 

1948 births
American people of German descent
American male soap opera actors
Living people
People from Canton, Massachusetts
Catholic Memorial School alumni
Fellows of the American Physical Society